Kamrej is a Satellite Town of Surat City in Surat district  in the state of Gujarat, India. Kamrej is a toll collection center on National Highway 8 from Mumbai to Delhi. kamrej is known for their fastfood and Night Dinner.

Demographics
 India census, Kamrej had a population of 12,746. Males constitute 57% of the population and females 43%. Kamrej has an average literacy rate of 71%, higher than the national average of 59.5%; with male literacy of 78% and female literacy of 62%. 14% of the population is under 6 years of age.

References

See also 
List of tourist attractions in Surat

Suburban area of Surat
Cities and towns in Surat district